Robert Eardley (born 12 January 1944, died 10 November 2022) was a Bahamian former sailor who competed in the 1964 Summer Olympics.

References

1944 births
Living people
Bahamian male sailors (sport)
Olympic sailors of the Bahamas
Sailors at the 1964 Summer Olympics – Dragon